"Baby, We're Really in Love" is a song written and recorded by Hank Williams and released on MGM Records.  It peaked at number four on the Billboard country singles chart.  It was recorded at Castle Studio in Nashville on July 25, 1951 with Fred Rose producing and backing from Don Helms (steel guitar), Jerry Rivers (fiddle), Sammy Pruett (lead guitar), Howard Watts (bass) and probably Jack Shook (rhythm guitar). It was his fourteenth Top 5 hit.

Cover versions
Don Gibson recorded the song for RCA Records in 1962.
Hank Williams, Jr. recorded it as an overdubbed duet for his father on MGM in 1965.
Leona Williams cut the song for Hickory Records.
The Reckless Drifters (John Easdale and Christa Collins) re-recorded this song in 2018. Sirius XM,"The Rodney Bingenheimer Show".

References

1951 songs
Hank Williams songs
Songs written by Hank Williams
Song recordings produced by Fred Rose (songwriter)